Lanesville Junior Senior High School is a public school in Lanesville, Indiana.

About
Lanesville Junior-Senior High School serves grade 7-12 and is part of the Lanesville Community School Corporation. It is attended by students from Lanesville and surrounding Franklin Township. The school is adjacent to Lanesville Elementary School, in the Little Indian Creek valley.

The school is staffed by 20 teachers with an average salary of $52,070. There were 340 student enrolled during the 2009–2010 school year.

Athletics
Lanesville's athletic teams are known as the Eagles and the school colors are purple and white.

The 2017 baseball team won the state 1A championship.

The 2019 baseball team won the 2A sectional championship.

The 2023 women’s basketball team won the state 1A championship.

See also
 List of high schools in Indiana

References

External links
Lanesville Public School Website
School Statistics

Public high schools in Indiana
Schools in Harrison County, Indiana
Public middle schools in Indiana